= Byron Goldstein =

American scientist

Byron B. Goldstein (born November 24, 1939) is an American scientist. He worked at Los Alamos National Laboratory (LANL) and was named a LANL Fellow in 2004. In 2011, Goldstein was selected as a fellow of the American Association for the Advancement of Science.
